Iron(II) oxide or ferrous oxide is the inorganic compound with the formula FeO.  Its mineral form is known as wüstite. One of several iron oxides, it is a black-colored powder that is sometimes confused with rust, the latter of which consists of hydrated iron(III) oxide (ferric oxide). Iron(II) oxide also refers to a family of related non-stoichiometric compounds, which are typically iron deficient with compositions ranging from Fe0.84O to Fe0.95O.

Preparation
FeO can be prepared by the thermal decomposition of iron(II) oxalate. 
FeC2O4   →   FeO  +  CO2  +  CO
The procedure is conducted under an inert atmosphere to avoid the formation of iron(III) oxide (Fe2O3).  A similar procedure can also be used for the synthesis of manganous oxide and stannous oxide.

Stoichiometric FeO can be prepared by heating Fe0.95O with metallic iron at 770 °C and 36 kbar.

Reactions
FeO is thermodynamically unstable below 575 °C, tending to disproportionate to metal and Fe3O4:
4FeO → Fe + Fe3O4

Structure
Iron(II) oxide adopts the cubic, rock salt structure, where iron atoms are octahedrally coordinated by oxygen atoms and the oxygen atoms octahedrally coordinated by iron atoms. The non-stoichiometry occurs because of the ease of oxidation of FeII to FeIII effectively replacing a small portion of FeII with two thirds their number of FeIII, which take up tetrahedral positions in the close packed oxide lattice.

In contrast to the crystalline solid, in the molten state iron atoms are coordinated by predominantly 4 or 5 oxygen atoms.

Below 200 K there is a minor change to the structure which changes the symmetry to rhombohedral and samples become antiferromagnetic.

Occurrence in nature
Iron(II) oxide makes up approximately 9% of the Earth's mantle. Within the mantle, it may be electrically conductive, which is a possible explanation for perturbations in Earth's rotation not accounted for by accepted models of the mantle's properties.

Uses
Iron(II) oxide is used as a pigment. It is FDA-approved for use in cosmetics and it is used in some tattoo inks.  It can also be used as a phosphate remover from home aquaria.

See also
 Iron(II) hydroxide
 Iron(II)

References

External links
 Wustite Mineral Data

Iron(II) compounds
Iron oxide pigments
Non-stoichiometric compounds
Transition metal oxides
Rock salt crystal structure
Glass dyes